The 2016–17 EBU Player of the Year Championship was the competition's third season. Points were accumulated over the EBU's ten most prestigious events from 1 October 2016 to 30 September 2017. Alexander Allfrey and Andrew Robson won for the second successive year, becoming the first players to win the title more than once.

List of Competitions

Summary of Results

This list displays the top ten players (including ties); 126 players received points. Winners of each event are highlighted in bold.

References

Contract bridge competitions
Contract bridge in the United Kingdom